= The Departure (2020 film) =

- Directed by: Merland Hoxha
- Written by: Merland Hoxha
- Produced by: Merland Hoxha
- Starring: Grant Wright Gunderson; Kendall Chappell; Austin Lauer; Olivia Lemmon; Jon Briddell
- Cinematography: Ludovica Isidori; Wey Wang
- Edited by: Juliette Edwards
- Release date: June 12, 2020
- Running time: 70 minutes
- Country: United States
- Language: English

The Departure is a 2020 American drama film directed by Merland Hoxha, starring Grant Wright Gunderson, Kendall Chappell, Austin Lauer, Olivia Lemmon and Jon Briddell.

== Cast ==
- Grant Wright Gunderson as Nate
- Kendall Chappell as Jessica
- Austin Lauer as John
- Olivia Lemmon as Amber
- Jon Briddell as Bruce

== Release ==
The film was released on digital on June 12, 2020.

== Reception ==
Bradley Gibson of Film Threat rated the film 7 stars out of 10 and called it "an entertaining film on the strength of the performances." Sean Axmaker of Video Librarian rated the film 2.5 stars out of 4 and called it "well-acted".

Barbara Kennedy of Ain't It Cool News gave the film a mixed review. Monica Castillo of RogerEbert.com gave the film a "thumbs down" and wrote that "It's as if we were watching an abusive relationship from the point-of-view of the manipulative partner."
